The Vintage Film Awards (VFA) are awards that recognize films released in previous decades with enduring popularity and continuing relevance in popular culture.

History

The Vintage Film Awards was founded in 2015 by journalist James Rogers. The event takes place in Brussels, Belgium. Shortlisted films are chosen on account of their continued popularity, sales, and relevance in popular culture.  Each year, shortlisted films are chosen from those officially released from 20, 30, 40 and 50 years prior.  Final nominees and winners are determined by public opinion surveys.

1st Vintage Film Awards

The 1st Vintage Film Awards were presented in a ceremony held on May 11, 2016 at the Brussels Press Club. Awards were given to the best films and performances from 1995, 1985, 1975, and 1965.

Shortlists and nominees
Winners were announced May 11, 2016 in Brussels.

2nd Vintage Film Awards
 
The 2nd Vintage Film Awards took place on May 5, 2017. Awards were given to the best films and performances from 1996, 1986, 1976, and 1966.

Shortlists and nominees

See also
 Classical Hollywood cinema

References

External links
 https://www.vintagefilmawards.com/

Awards established in 2015
Web awards